KS Górnik Polkowice is a Polish football club based in Polkowice, Poland. The club currently plays in II liga which is the third tier of Polish football. They competed in the top tier for one season, in 2003–04.

History 

KS Górnik Polkowice were founded in 1947.

From 2003 until 2004, Górnik played their only season in Ekstraklasa, the top tier of Polish football. They drew 0–0 against Świt Nowy Dwór Mazowiecki to finish 14th, which qualified them for a relegation play-out against Cracovia. They lost the relegation play-out 8–0 on aggregate.

In 2021, after winning the II liga, Górnik were promoted to I liga, making their return after they were relegated at the end of the 2011–12 season.

Naming history
Klub Sportowy „Włókniarz” Polkowice - 1947
Ludowy Zespół Sportowy Polkowice - 1951
Terenowy Klub Sportowy „Górnik” - 1967
Międzyzakładowy Klub Sportowy „Górnik” Polkowice - 1977
Klub Sportowy „Górnik” Polkowice - 1987
Klub Sportowy Polkowice sp. z o.o. - 2011
Klub Sportowy Górnik Polkowice - 2018

Current squad

Out on loan

Managers
1956–1970 – Tadeusz Ptasznik
1970–1971 – Ryszard Łakomiec
1971–1972 – Wojciech Gawryszewski
1973–1975 – Alojzy Sitko
1975–1976 – Roman Badak
1976–1981 – Krzysztof Pawlica
1981–1982 – Bogdan Jankowski, Stefan Beńko
1983–1987 – Henryk Markowski
1988 – Andrzej Kot
1989 – Mieczysław Bieniusiewicz, Edward Wojewódzki
1989–1990 – Rudolf Rupa, Piotr Wójcik
1991–1992 – Krzysztof Pawlica
1992–1993 – Ireneusz Frąckowiak, Marian Putyra
1994–1995 – Artur Sikorski
1996 – Bruno Zachariasiewicz, Artur Sikorski
1997 – Stanisław Kumik
1997–2001 – Mirosław Dragan
2001–2002 – Romuald Szukiełowicz
2002–2004 – Mirosław Dragan
2005 – Wiesław Wojno
2005 – Marek Koniarek
2006 – Mirosław Dragan
2006–2011 – Dominik Nowak
2011 – Bartłomiej Majewski
2011–2012 – Janusz Kudyba
2012–2013 – Adam Buczek
2013 – Janusz Kubot
2013 – Zbigniew Mandziejewicz
2014–2017 – Jarosław Pedryc
2017–2020 – Enkeleid Dobi
2020–2021 – Janusz Niedźwiedź
2021 – Paweł Barylski
2021–2022 – Szymon Szydełko
2022–current – Tomasz Grzegorczyk

References

External links
 Official Website
 Górnik Polkowice at 90minut.pl 
 KS Polkowice at 90minut.pl 

Association football clubs established in 1947
1947 establishments in Poland
Football clubs in Lower Silesian Voivodeship
Polkowice County
Mining association football clubs in Poland